The Lost Weekend may refer to:

Fiction 
 The Lost Weekend (novel), a 1944 novel by Charles R. Jackson
 The Lost Weekend (film), a 1945 film adaptation of the novel
 "The Lost Weekend" (The Cosby Show), an episode of The Cosby Show
 "The Lost Weekend" (Dawson's Creek), an episode of Dawson's Creek
 "The Lost Weekend", a 1997 straight-to-video feature-length episode of Brookside

Music 
 The Lost Weekend (album), 1985 album by Danny & Dusty
 Lost Weekend (EP), a 2002 EP by The Clientele
 "Lost Weekend", a song by The Bats from Couchmaster
 Lost Weekend (song), a 1985 song by Lloyd Cole and the Commotions
 "Lost Weekend", a song by The Qemists from Join the Q
 "Lost Weekend", a song by Wall of Voodoo from Call of the West
 "Lost weekend", John Lennon's description of his relationship with May Pang